Ashlee Atkins (born 2 April 1993) is a retired Australian rules footballer who played for Gold Coast Suns in the AFL Women's (AFLW). Atkins was drafted by Fremantle with their fourth selection and twenty-sixth overall in the 2017 AFL Women's draft. In April 2019, she signed with expansion club, West Coast. In May 2022, West Coast delisted Atkins.
In June 2022, Gold Coast had confirmed they had signed Atkins. On 11 November 2022, she announced her retirement.

References

External links 

1993 births
Living people
Fremantle Football Club (AFLW) players
Australian rules footballers from Western Australia
West Coast Eagles (AFLW) players
Gold Coast Football Club (AFLW) players